Fényi is a small lunar crater on the far side of the Moon. It lies near the southern edge of the huge, braided skirt of ejecta that surrounds the Orientale impact Basin to the north. Less than two crater diameters to the southwest is the much larger crater Mendel.

Much of the rim and nearly all of this crater have been buried under material from the Orientale Basin impact. The surrounding terrain shows a radial pattern of grooves and braids running from north to south. Only a ring of material protrudes upward from this bed of ejecta, displaying the location of the original rim. There is a small craterlet along the northeast inner wall.

This crater lies within the Mendel-Rydberg Basin, a 630 km wide impact basin of Nectarian age.

Satellite craters
By convention these features are identified on lunar maps by placing the letter on the side of the crater midpoint that is closest to Fényi.

References

 
 
 
 
 
 
 
 
 
 
 
 

Impact craters on the Moon